Kelvin Institute of Technology (KIT) is a college in Dehradun city of Uttarakhand State, presently offering graduate professional courses for BBA ( Bachelor of Business Administration), BCA (Bachelor of Computer Application), BSc.IT ( Bachelor of Science- Information Technology), BSc.Animation ( Bachelor of Science- Animation) and BCom (Bachelor of Commerce).

Background
The college was established in the year 2012, in a rented building at Indira Nagar, an area in Dehradun city. The campus was shifted to its permanent location in Jhajra Area, in Dehradun in October 2012. It has its affiliation from Sri Dev Suman Uttarakhand University, which is a state government's authorized body to provide affiliation to colleges. Till the year 2017, the four initial courses BBA, BCA, BScIT, and BSc.Animation was affiliated to Uttarakhand Technical University (UTU). When BCom was added as a new course in the year 2017, the government of Uttarakhand State passed an official order to transfer all UTU's Bachelor degree courses under the practice of Sri Dev Suman Uttarakhand Technical University. Hence, all the initial courses were also moved under the affiliation of Sri Dev Suman Uttarakhand University.

Presently, college is running with five professional graduate courses – BBA, BCA, BSc.IT, BSc. Animation and BCom. The affiliation of 60 seats was given for all courses except for BSc. Animation, which has 30 seats for admission.

References

External links
 Official Website of Kelvin Institute of Technology

Universities and colleges in Dehradun
Science and technology in Dehradun
Educational institutions established in 2012
2012 establishments in Uttarakhand